Betrayal is a 2012 Russian drama film directed by Kirill Serebrennikov. The film was selected to compete for the Golden Lion at the 69th Venice International Film Festival. At the 2012 Abu Dhabi Film Festival, Franziska Petri won the award for Best Actress.

Plot
Two random acquaintances learn that their spouses are lovers. This discovery makes them act in a way they would not have dared earlier.

Cast
 Albina Dzhanabaeva
 Dejan Lilic
 Franziska Petri
 Artūrs Skrastiņš
 Svetlana Mamresheva

References

External links
 

2012 films
2012 drama films
2010s Russian-language films
Films directed by Kirill Serebrennikov
Russian drama films